Real World/Road Rules Challenge: The Inferno II is the 10th season of the MTV reality game show, The Challenge (at the time known as Real World/Road Rules Challenge). The season is directly subsequent to Battle of the Sexes 2.

The Inferno II is the second of The Inferno series, with the original Inferno airing in 2004, and The Inferno 3 following in 2007. The show aired in 2005, and took place in Manzanillo, Mexico. This challenge was the same as The Inferno, except this time each team was allowed to choose only one "Inferno nominee" from the opposite team. This nominee had to win the "life shield" to save him or herself. The contestants in this challenge were grouped into two teams of "Good Guys" and "Bad Asses", representing the "heroes" and "villains" of their respective seasons.

On December 15, 2020, the season was made available to stream on Netflix in the United States.

Contestants

Gameplay

Inferno games
Hang Tough: Contestants had to hang on monkey bars and try and knock their opponent off. The last player standing wins the Inferno.
Played by: Dan vs. Jon
Shack Attack: Each player will be shackled by the waist to a wall and must run across the field to retrieve a key that will unlock their harness. The first player to unlock their harness wins the Inferno.
Played by: Tina vs. Robin
Knock Your Block Off: Each contestant will wear a helmet with a block fastened on top. The object of the game is to try and knock the block off their opponent's head using a pugil stick. Whoever knocks their opponents block off wins the Inferno.
Played by: Landon vs. Karamo
That's A Wrap: The objective is to mummify yourself using a long spool of cloth. The first person to completely finish their spool and run across the field to their team flag wins the Inferno.
Played by: Veronica vs. Jodi
Balls In: Each player will be given five chances to get as many balls inside a basket. If a player steps out of the ring the basket is surrounded by, their ball is considered "dead." The player who has more baskets than their opponent wins the Inferno.
Played by: Abram vs. Brad
Patch Work: Each player will be harnessed to a bungee while wearing a gymsuit with 27 patches. The object is to rip off all the patches from the opposing player and place as many patches as they can in their basket. The player with the most patches in their basket wins the Inferno.
Played by: Tonya vs. Julie
Pegged: Each player must climb to the top of a wall using two pegs. The player who can get to the top of the wall and rip their flag off wins the Inferno.
Played by: Landon vs. Dan
Spinner: Each player will be strapped to a giant wheel and will be spun at different speeds. The player that holds on to their team flag the longest wins the Inferno.
Played by: Tonya vs. Shavonda

Game summary

 The contestant was saved by another contestant with a Life Saver
 The contestant won the Life Saver and saved themselves
 The contestant won the Life Saver and put themselves in the Inferno
 The contestant was placed in the Inferno by the Life Saver winner

Inferno progress

Teams
 The contestant is on the Bad Asses team
 The contestant is on the Good Guys team
Competition
 The contestant won the final challenge
 The contestant lost the final challenge
 The contestant won the Life Saver and saved themselves
 The contestant won the Life Saver but did not use it
 The contestant was safe from the Inferno
 The contestant was selected to go into the Inferno
 The contestant was saved by the Life Saver winner
 The contestant was selected to go into the Inferno and won
 The contestant won the Life Saver, went into the Inferno and won
 The contestant lost the Inferno and was eliminated
 The contestant was put into the Inferno by the Life Saver winner, lost and was eliminated
 The contestant withdrew from the competition

Teams

Episodes

Reunion special
Instead of a reunion special, a  wrap-up special To Hell & Back: Hot Gossip from the Inferno 2 aired on June 27, 2005.

Notes

References

External links
 MTV's official Real World website
 MTV's official Road Rules website

Inferno 2
2005 American television seasons
Television shows set in Mexico
Television shows filmed in Mexico